Roger Melanson is a former Canadian politician, who was elected to the Legislative Assembly of New Brunswick in the 2010 provincial election, and Leader of the Opposition. He represented the electoral district of Dieppe as a member of the Liberals.

On October 7, 2014, Melanson was appointed to the Executive Council of New Brunswick as Minister of Finance, and Minister of Transportation and Infrastructure.

On September 6, 2017, in a cabinet shuffle, Melanson was named Minister of Treasury Board and Post-Secondary Education. From October 5, 2018 to November 9, 2018 Melanson served as Minister of Energy and Resource Development. He was re-elected in the 2020 provincial election.

On September 28, 2020 he was chosen as interim leader of the opposition Liberal party of New Brunswick, replacing Kevin Vickers who had resigned following the provincial election of September 14.

He remained interim leader until August 2022, when Susan Holt won a party leadership election in which Melanson was not a candidate.

On October 13, 2022, Melanson announced that he would be departing from provincial politics after 12 years, on October 21, 2022.

References

New Brunswick Liberal Association MLAs
Acadian people
Living people
Members of the Executive Council of New Brunswick
21st-century Canadian politicians
Finance ministers of New Brunswick
Year of birth missing (living people)